Snake venom factor V activator is an enzyme. This enzyme catalyses the following chemical reaction

 Fully activates human clotting factor V by a single cleavage at the Trp-Tyr-Leu-Arg1545-Ser-Asn-Asn-Gly bond.

This enzyme is present in venom of Daboia russelii.

References

External links 
 

EC 3.4.21